Óscar Alexander Pareja Gómez (born 10 August 1968) is a Colombian professional football manager and former player. He is currently the head coach of Orlando City in Major League Soccer. Pareja is nicknamed El Generalito, the Little General, but is now called Papi.

Playing career

Pareja came up through the youth system of Independiente Medellin; however, he began his professional career in 1987, debuting for renowned club Independiente Medellín. In his debut, he assisted on the winning goal in a 1–0 victory. He played eight years with the club, from 1987 to 1995, helping them to be Categoría Primera A runners-up in 1993, and leading them to a respectable performance in the 1994 Copa Libertadores. In 1995, Deportivo Cali purchased Pareja from Independiente Medellín; he paid immediate dividends, helping Cali to a championship in the 1995–1996 season, their first in 22 years. He would stay with them four years.

Pareja then signed with Major League Soccer (MLS) of the United States. After joining MLS, Pareja was allocated to the New England Revolution on 26 May 1998, but was soon traded to the Dallas Burn for Mexican forward Damian Alvarez. Although Pareja played little for Dallas in 1998, he earned himself a place at the center of Dallas's midfield for the 1999 season, playing 27 games and scoring four goals and six assists, while coordinating the Burn attack. He remained in this position for six more years, playing in 189 regular season games for Dallas, while scoring 13 goals and 52 assists, and was named to the MLS Best XI in 2002. He announced he would retire following the 2005 MLS season and remained with the club, now renamed as FC Dallas, as an assistant coach.

International
Pareja also played for the Colombia national football team. In 11 caps, he scored three goals and played in the 1991 Copa América.

Coaching career
Pareja spent two seasons as an assistant coach with FC Dallas in 2006 and 2007. He then left the club to join the United States men's national under-17 soccer team as an assistant coach at the IMG Soccer Academy in 2007–08. He then returned to the coaching staff at FC Dallas as a director and coach in their youth system. He was praised for the system's achievements and was named the U-18 Academy Coach of the Year for the 2010–11 season. For the 2011 MLS season, Pareja returned to the first team as an assistant coach. He was also head coach for the reserve team.

The Colorado Rapids signed Pareja to his first head coach job on 5 January 2012. After finishing 7th in his debut season, Pareja led the Rapids to the playoffs in 2013. After two seasons he stepped down as Colorado head coach on 4 January 2014.

Pareja was announced as the head coach of his former club, FC Dallas, on 10 January 2014, after Dallas traded a first-round 2015 MLS SuperDraft pick and allocation money to Colorado. Having missed the playoffs the last two seasons prior to Pareja's arrival, FC Dallas made the postseason in his debut season as head coach. In 2015, Dallas topped the Western Conference regular season table, finishing runners-up for the Supporters' Shield to New York Red Bulls. The following year the club did a domestic double winning both the Supporters Shield and the U.S. Open Cup, defeating New England Revolution 4–2 in the final. It was the club's first Supporters' Shield win and second time lifting the U.S. Open Cup having last done so in 1997.

Amid speculation about interest from Liga MX, Pareja stepped down as manager of Dallas following the completion of the 2018 season. He had a combined 18 years at the club as a player, coach, and manager. Club Tijuana announced Pareja as their new manager on 27 November 2018. After 12 months, Pareja leaves Tijuana under mutual agreement 

On 4 December 2019, Pareja returned to MLS, becoming the fourth permanent head coach of Orlando City. With the season affected by the COVID-19 pandemic two rounds into the season, Pareja guided Orlando to the MLS is Back Tournament final on the resumption of play, the team's first final in their MLS era. Orlando finished top of Group A taking 7 points from three matches and notably eliminated reigning Supporters' Shield winners Los Angeles FC in the quarter-final before eventually losing to Portland Timbers 2–1 in the final.

Coaching record 
All competitive games are included.

Coaching honors

FC Dallas
MLS Supporters' Shield: 2016
 Runners-up: 2015
U.S. Open Cup: 2016

Orlando City SC
U.S. Open Cup: 2022

See also
 List of MLS coaches

References

External links

Deportivo Cali 
Independiente Medellín 

1968 births
Living people
Footballers from Medellín
Colombian footballers
Colombia under-20 international footballers
Colombia international footballers
1991 Copa América players
Independiente Medellín footballers
Deportivo Cali footballers
New England Revolution players
FC Dallas players
Colombian football managers
Colorado Rapids coaches
FC Dallas coaches
Orlando City SC coaches
Categoría Primera A players
Major League Soccer players
Major League Soccer coaches
Colombian expatriate footballers
Expatriate soccer players in the United States
FC Dallas non-playing staff
Association football midfielders